Ādam Khākī, also known as Khaki Pir, was a 14th-century Sufi Muslim figure in the Sylhet region. In 1303, he took part in the final battle of the Conquest of Sylhet led by Shah Jalal. His shrine has become a popular tourist site.

Biography
After meeting with Shah Jalal, Adam decided to accompany him in his expedition across the Indian subcontinent to propagate the religion of Islam. In 1303, he took part in the final battle of the Conquest of Sylhet under Shah Jalal's leadership against Raja Gour Govinda. Following the victory, Shah Jalal ordered his companions to disperse across Eastern Bengal and surrounding areas. Adam migrated to the modern-day village of Deorail  in Badarpur where he preached to the local people.

Legacy
It is unclear how and what year he died, but he was buried in a dargah in Badarpur, Karimganj, in close proximity to the modern-day Badarpur railway station. A mosque was built within the complex, and it became a notable site in Badarpur attracting Muslims and Hindus alike. Those attached to the maqam of Adam Khaki were given Pirmuttara land grants.

Nur Ali (1880-1963) of Gorkapon in Badarpur was a noteworthy Mawlana who requested Abdul Latif Chowdhury Fultali to visit the mosque. In 1946, Fultali announced that he would be travelling to Badarpur to give a lesson on qira'at at the mosque. Abd an-Nur Gorkaponi and his students purchased a horse for the scholar to ride on so the journey could be easier.

References

People from Karimganj district
14th-century Indian Muslims
Bengali Sufi saints

ar:آدم خاكي
as:আদম খাকী
bn:আদম খাকী
fa:آدم خاكى
hi:आदम ख़ाकी
pnb:آدم خاكى
ur:آدم خاكى